is a Pokémon species in Nintendo and Game Freak's Pokémon franchise and one of the Mythical Pokémon. Created by Ken Sugimori, it first appeared in the video games Pokémon Gold and Silver and later appeared in various merchandise, spinoff titles and animated and printed adaptations of the franchise. Celebi appears with central roles in the anime movies Pokémon 4Ever, Zoroark: Master of Illusions and Secrets of the Jungle (as a shiny). In the Pokémon Adventures manga, one of the main antagonists, Pryce, seeks Celebi so he can travel back in time.

Design and characteristics
Created by Ken Sugimori, Celebi is a green onion-like creature (its original design was based on Kokopelli). Celebi has round toeless feet, three-fingered hands and translucent wings on its back. Celebi has a round head that comes to a point that sticks upward in the back and resembles the shape of an onion, particularly a pearl onion. It has large baby-blue eyes, with thick black rings around them, and a pair of green antennae that are tipped blue. Celebi is a time traveling mythical Pokémon that debuted in Pokémon Gold and Pokémon Silver. Celebi is a Psychic Grass type Pokémon that has the species category as the "Time Travel" Pokémon. It is known as the guardian of the forest, where it is worshipped as a god. It wanders through time, visiting various undisturbed old-growth forests during peaceful times, leaving behind flourishing grass and trees. It often leaves behind an egg that it brought from the future. Celebi's continuing existence signifies a good future.

Appearances

In the video games
In the video games, Celebi is an only available by being distributed from an event. In the Japanese version of Pokémon Crystal, Celebi could be found by the use of a GS Ball, which was obtainable by using the Pokémon Mobile System GB; however, in the Virtual Console releases of Crystal, the GS Ball can be obtained after entering the Hall of Fame. Celebi was obtainable from the Japanese Pokémon Colosseum bonus disc, which was available with pre-orders. In Pokémon HeartGold and SoulSilver, Celebi activates an event in the game, which takes the player back in time to battle Giovanni. In North America, Celebi was distributed through GameStop stores from February 21 to March 6, 2011, or acquired from the tour promoting the Black and White games that began on February 5, 2011. In Pokémon X and Y Celebi could be obtained as a gift in Pokémon Bank. It also on other Pokémon games such as Pokémon Stadium 2, Pokémon Ruby and Sapphire, Pokémon FireRed and LeafGreen, Pokémon Emerald, Pokémon Platinum, Pokémon HeartGold and SoulSilver, Pokémon Black and White, Pokémon Black 2 and White 2, Pokémon X and Y, Pokémon Omega Ruby and Alpha Sapphire and Pokémon Sword and Shield

Outside of the main series, Celebi has appeared in Pokémon Colosseum, Pokémon Channel, Pokémon Trozei!, Pokémon Mystery Dungeon: Blue Rescue Team and Red Rescue Team, Pokémon Ranger, Pokémon Mystery Dungeon: Explorers of Time and Explorers of Darkness, Pokémon Mystery Dungeon: Explorers of Sky, Pokémon Ranger: Shadows of Almia, PokéPark Wii: Pikachu's Adventure, Pokémon Ranger: Guardian Signs, Pokémon Rumble Blast, Pokémon Rumble U, Pokémon Battle Trozei, Pokémon Shuffle, Pokémon Rumble World, Pokémon Picross, Pokémon Rumble Rush, Pokémon Mystery Dungeon: Rescue Team DX, Pokémon Café Mix, Pokkén Tournament, Pokémon GO and New Pokémon Snap.

In other media
In the anime, Celebi is represented as a generally weak Pokémon that constantly needs protection. Celebi is one of the main characters in the movie Pokémon 4Ever. In this movie, Celebi is running away from a hunter. It crashes into young Samuel Oak who protects it, and in return, Celebi transports them forty years into the future, where Sam teams up with Ash Ketchum to save Celebi from a Team Rocket member who turns it into a Dark Celebi by capturing it in a Dark Poké Ball. Near the end of the movie, several dozen Celebi appear from all sorts of different eras in time to help out. It also makes appearances in various episodes. Celebi appeared in a central role again in Zoroark: Master of Illusions. Grings Kodai was after the Pokémon in order to restore his ability to see the future, which he got in a previous encounter with it. In the anime, Celebi has made many small appearances, the most notable being in Pokémon Chronicles. In Celebi and Joy, Celebi took Ritchie back in time to help stop the destruction of a Pokémon Center. A shiny Celebi appeared in the 23rd film, Secrets of the Jungle.

In Pokémon Adventures, Pryce aimed to capture Celebi and use its time-traveling powers to save his two Lapras, which he had lost years prior to the storyline. He failed numerous times throughout his reign, and would injure himself on each day of the month in which Celebi would show itself in the Ilex shrine, so Green and Silver took this opportunity to steal his items and escape. Near the end of the RS Saga, Ruby is revealed to have a Celebi. He explains that due to the lack of information he had on it, he rarely uses Celebi at all. Celebi was used to retrieve the Red and Blue Orbs from Maxie and Archie, to prevent them from ever controlling Groudon and Kyogre again. Then, it revived Norman, Steven, and Courtney by sending them through an altered future.

Celebi also appeared in Pokémon: Sun And Moon, in the episode "A Timeless Encounter" while sending Ash to the past to visit young Kukui, which resulted in Ash gaining a Firium Z.

Reception
Since it appeared in the Pokémon series, Celebi has been featured in numerous pieces of merchandise, including figures, plush toys, and the Pokémon Trading Card Game. A Game Boy Advance featuring art of Celebi on its box as well as two white silhouettes of it on the unit itself was released as a promotion. The system changes colors depending on how it is held. A promotional e-Card was released at Space World 2001 that, when scanned, would feature Celebi floating around on the player's Game Boy Advance screen eating apples off of a tree. Liz Finnegan of The Escapist listed Celebi as 84th of their favorite Pokémon, describing it as "freaking adorable, and it time travels." IGN ranked Celebi as the 79th of the best Pokémon.

TV Guide editor Angel Cohn described Celebi as a "diminutive, onion-shaped creature", stating that the resemblance between Celebi and Dr. Seuss' The Lorax was "striking". SPIN magazine also described it as resembling an onion. Variety editor Robert Koehler stated that Celebi appeared to appeal to young girls, describing it as an "Anime teardrop of a critter, with enormous, aquamarine eyes". Rotten Tomatoes editor Jeffrey Westhoff described Celebi as looking like "Tinkerbell with an onion for a head" as well as having many of E.T.'s tricks. Canoe.ca editor Liz Braun similarly compared Celebi to Tinkerbell, also describing its appearance as being similar to a goldfish's. The Dallas Morning News editor Nancy Churnin described Celebi as "lovable", while Post-Gazette editor Sharon Eberson called it "cute". The Daily Herald editor Dann Gire described Celebi as a "teardrop-shaped entity with big puppy dog eyes", commenting that its words sound like the "goo-gooey utterances of an infant".

GamesRadar+ called Celebi one of its favourite Pokémon, along with Suicune. They also describe it as "cute" and the "gem of any collection." They compare Celebi to Shaymin, a Pokémon from Pokémon Diamond and Pearl, describing both of them as "diminutive" and "super cute". IGN editor "Pokémon of the Day Chick" commented that Celebi was the "crappiest solo" legendary, explaining solo to mean a legendary Pokémon without counterparts (i.e. Articuno, Zapdos, and Moltres). She adds that she feels the "slightest twinge of pity" for Celebi. Authors Tracey West and Katherine Noll called Celebi the seventh best Pokémon overall and wrote that it had a "sweet appearance" that belied its "amazing power".

Celebi also is the namesake for the Pokémon news website Serebii, coming from the Pokémon's Japanese name.

References

External links

Celebi on Bulbapedia
Celebi on Pokemon.com

Fictional characters with plant abilities
Fictional fairies and sprites
Fictional psychics
Pokémon species
Video game characters introduced in 1999
Time travelers